The Tuxworth Ministry was the ministry of the second Chief Minister of the Northern Territory, Ian Tuxworth. It was sworn in on 17 October 1984 after the resignation of Chief Minister Paul Everingham to run for the Australian House of Representatives and his replacement by Ian Tuxworth.

First ministry (17 October 1984 – 20 December 1984)

It saw little change otherwise from the previous ministry, with Tuxworth taking on Everingham's other portfolios. It operated until 20 December of that year, when Tuxworth initiated a major reshuffle of the ministry.

Second ministry (21 December 1984 – 19 August 1985)

The second ministry was sworn in on 21 December 1984, following a major reshuffle by newly appointed Chief Minister Tuxworth. The new ministry saw significant changes to the roles of a number of key figures. Tuxworth took on the role of Treasurer, formerly held by Marshall Perron, with Perron becoming Attorney-General. Jim Robertson, the former Attorney-General, became Minister for Health, and Daryl Manzie took on Robertson's other former portfolio as Minister for Transport and Works. The new ministry also saw the appointment of two new ministers: Barry Coulter and future Chief Minister Stephen Hatton, and the axing of one minister, former housing and conservation minister Noel Padgham-Purich. It operated until 19 August 1985, when a further ministerial reshuffle took place.

The role of Leader of Government Business is usually filled by a Cabinet member; however, from 26 February 1985 the position was occupied by Ray Hanrahan, who did not hold ministerial office.

Third ministry (20 August 1985 – 28 April 1986)

The third ministry was sworn in on 20 August 1985, after a minor reshuffle by Tuxworth. The new ministry saw former Health Minister Jim Robertson appointed to a short-lived portfolio of Special Minister for Constitutional Development, aimed at pursuing statehood for the territory. The portfolio was later dropped due to waning interest in the issue when Robertson resigned from parliament in March 1986. Robertson's prior role as Health Minister was filled by new ministerial appointment Ray Hanrahan. The ministry operated until 28 April 1986, when the sudden resignation from the ministry of Attorney-General and former Deputy Chief Minister Marshall Perron forced a significant reshuffle.

Fourth ministry (29 April 1986 – 14 May 1986)

The fourth ministry was sworn in on 29 April 1986 as a result of a major reshuffle caused in part by the sudden resignation from the ministry of Attorney-General and former Deputy Chief Minister Marshall Perron. Tuxworth ceded the position of Treasurer to Barry Coulter. Former transport minister Daryl Manzie was appointed Attorney-General in Perron's place, while also replacing Tom Harris as Minister for Education. Harris replaced Ray Hanrahan as Minister for Health, with Hanrahan being demoted to responsibilities for communications and tourism. The ministry also saw the promotion of new minister Don Dale, who was given several junior portfolios. It operated until 14 May 1986, when Tuxworth was ousted as Chief Minister by Mines and Energy Minister Stephen Hatton.

References

Northern Territory ministries